Wilhelm Meyer-Lübke (30 January 1861 – 4 October 1936) was a Swiss philologist of the Neogrammarian school of linguistics.

Biography 

Meyer-Lübke, a nephew of Conrad Ferdinand Meyer, was born in Dübendorf, Switzerland. He studied Indo-European philology at Zürich (with Heinrich Schweizer-Sidler) and at Berlin (with Johannes Schmidt). He obtained his PhD in Romance philology with a dissertation on Die Schicksale des lateinischen Neutrums im Romanischen (1883). After a stay in Italy, he qualified to lecture at Zürich and then attended lectures by Gaston Paris in Paris.

While lecturing at Zürich in 1887, he was appointed associate professor of comparative linguistics at Jena. From there he was called in 1890 to Vienna, where he was from 1892 to 1915 professor of Romance philology, as well as serving as dean and rector (1906/07). He then went to Bonn, where he was appointed to the professorship formerly held by Friedrich Diez (1794–1876). However, Meyer-Lübke soon felt the difference between the cosmopolitan Vienna and provincial Bonn. He consoled himself with lecture tours and visiting professorships abroad. Meyer-Lübke was a leading Romance linguist of his time.

Key published works 
 Grammatik der romanischen Sprachen ("Grammar of the Romance Languages") published in 4 volumes between 1890 and 1902.
 Einführung in das Studium der romanischen Sprachwissenschaft ("Introduction to the Study of Romance Linguistics"), 1901.
 Romanisches etymologisches Wörterbuch ("Etymological Dictionary of Romance"), Heidelberg, C. Winter, 1911.

Notes

External links
 
 

Linguists from Switzerland
Swiss Hispanists
Romance philologists
1861 births
1936 deaths
Academic staff of the University of Bonn
University of Zurich alumni
Academic staff of the University of Vienna
People from Dübendorf
Members of the Institute for Catalan Studies
Corresponding Fellows of the Medieval Academy of America